Mogoplistidae is a family of scaly crickets within the superfamily Grylloidea. Considered to be monophyletic, a sister taxon to the Gryllidae crickets. This family consists of more than 370 species worldwide; 20 species in 4 genera occur in North America and this family includes the scaly crickets of Europe.

Subfamilies, Tribes and selected Genera
The Orthoptera Species File lists the following:

Malgasiinae
Auth.: Gorochov 1984
Malgasia Uvarov, 1940

Mogoplistinae
Auth.: Brunner von Wattenwyl 1873
tribe Arachnocephalini Gorochov 1984
Apterornebius Ingrisch, 2006
Arachnocephalus Costa, 1855
Bothromogoplistes Gorochov, 2020
Cycloptiloides Sjöstedt, 1909
Cycloptilum Scudder, 1869
Discophallus Gorochov, 2009
Ectatoderus Guérin-Méneville, 1847
Ornebius Guérin-Méneville, 1844
Pseudomogoplistes Gorochov, 1984
†Pseudarachnocephalus Gorochov, 2010
tribe Mogoplistini Brunner von Wattenwyl 1873
Biama Otte & Alexander, 1983
Collendina Otte & Alexander, 1983
Derectaotus Chopard, 1936
Ectatoderus Guérin-Méneville, 1847
Eucycloptilum Chopard, 1935
Gotvendia Bolívar, 1927
Hoplosphyrum Rehn & Hebard, 1912
Kalyra Otte & Alexander, 1983
Kiah Otte & Alexander, 1983
Marinna Otte & Alexander, 1983
Microgryllus Philippi, 1863
Micrornebius Chopard, 1969
Mogoplistes Serville, 1838
Musgravia Otte, 1994
Oligacanthopus Rehn & Hebard, 1912
Pachyornebius Chopard, 1969
Paramogoplistes Gorochov, 1984
Pongah Otte & Alexander, 1983
Talia Otte & Alexander, 1983
Terraplistes Ingrisch, 2006
Tubarama Yamasaki, 1985
Yarabina Otte, 1994

†Protomogoplistinae
†Protomogoplistes Gorochov, 2010 Burmese amber, Myanmar, Cenomanian

Ecology
These crickets have a worldwide distribution: especially in tropical/subtropical environments near water. Like many other crickets, they are omnivorous scavengers and will eat fungi, plant material, and other insects. Members of this family are distinguished from closely related families by the scales that covers their abdomen and parts of their thorax and resemble those of Lepidoptera.

History
The family was originally described by Brunner von Wattenwyl in 1873, but a genus (mogoplistes) was described earlier, 1838, by Serville and was the basis for the family nomenclature. Mogoplistidae has three subfamilies: Mogoplistinae, Malgasiinae and Protomogoplistinae. Little work has been completed to classify and describe these crickets although work has been done on their acoustic development and identification of new characters.

References

Crickets
Ensifera
Extant Jurassic first appearances
Orthoptera families